The Alfarista Radical Front (FRA) was a centrist liberal party in Ecuador, founded in 1972. One of its best known figures was former acting president Fabián Alarcón.

The party was named after the most prominent liberal politician in Ecuadorian history, Eloy Alfaro, who founded the country's first institutionalized Liberal Party in 1884.

In the 2002 Ecuadorian general election, the party supported the candidacy of Xavier Neira Menéndez.

See also
Liberalism
Contributions to liberal theory
Liberalism worldwide
List of liberal parties
Liberal democracy
Liberalism and radicalism in Ecuador
Terrorism in Ecuador

References

Liberal parties in Ecuador
Political parties established in 1972
Radical parties
Terrorism in Ecuador